Escape Plan is an American prison action thriller film series based on characters created by Miles Chapman and Arnell Jesko. The series is centered around Ray Breslin, a security analyst and escape artist who helps design supermax prison by posing as an inmate to find their flaws; later films center around his security and hostage rescue firm. The series stars Sylvester Stallone, with a supporting cast including Arnold Schwarzenegger, Dave Bautista and Curtis "50 Cent" Jackson as allies and associates of Breslin. All entries in the series since the second film have primarily been released direct-to-video, though they have also been released in some theaters. The series has received a mixed-to-negative critical response.

Films

Escape Plan (2013)

Security expert Ray Breslin's work consists of being imprisoned in high-security prisons, then attempting to escape to highlight flaws in their security. Accepting a job offer to escape a specialized maximum-security prison—on the condition that he does not know its location—he finds himself incarcerated in the world's most secret and secure prison, "The Tomb". When the plan goes awry and he finds himself actually incarcerated for life, Breslin must team up with his fellow prisoners and use his skills and experience to escape.

Escape Plan 2: Hades (2018)

Years after escaping The Tomb, Ray Breslin has expanded his security company's operations, hiring a team and working a wide range of operations. After a team member goes missing during a routine operation, Breslin and his associate Trent DeRosa must work to rescue them from their high-tech off-the-grid prison known as "HADES".

Escape Plan: The Extractors (2019)

When a business magnate's daughter and her entourage are abducted, Ray Breslin and his team must work with her former bodyguard to rescue them from the top secret black site they are imprisoned in, operated by the vengeful son of his former business partner who betrayed him years prior.

Main cast and characters

Additional crew and production details

Reception

Box office performance

Critical and public response

References 

Action film series
Film series introduced in 2013
Trilogies